Roskilde Festival 2005 was held 30 June – 3 July 2005 with warm-up and camping from 26 June. The festival was not sold out at festival start, because of the rainy weather at Roskilde Festival 2004.

Band list 

13 & God (D/US)
5th Element feat. Anthony Cruz, Jah Mason, Richie Spice (JAM)
Addictive TV (UK)
Alter Ego (D)
Die Anarchistische Abendunterhaltung (B)
…And You Will Know Us by the Trail of Dead (US)
Angu (GRL)
Ata (D)
Ataf (DK)
Athlete (UK)
Audioslave (US)
Autechre (UK)
Enzo Avitabile & Bottari (I)
Devendra Banhart (US)
The Be Good Tanyas (CAN)
Beatsteaks (D)
Bjørn Berge (N)
Bikstok Røgsystem (DK)
Black Sabbath (UK)
Bloc Party (UK)
The Blue Van (DK)
BNegão & Os Seletores de Freqüência (BRA)
Bright Eyes (US)
Brúðarbandið (ISL)
Yuri Buenaventura (CO)
Captain Comatose (US/D)
Cartridge (DK)
Chic (US)
Ida Corr (DK)
Carl Cox (UK)
Jamie Cullum (UK)
D-A-D (DK)
Datarock(N)
The Dears (CAN)
Death from Above 1979 (CAN)
Desorden Público (VEN)
Toumani Diabaté (ML)
Dial Zero (DK)
John Digweed (UK)
Djosos Krost (DK)
The Dresden Dolls (US)
Dungen (S)
Duran Duran (UK)
Dwi Mekar (IDN)
Efterklang (DK)
Enslaved (N)
Erwin Thomas (DK)
Eskobar (S)
Evil Nine (UK)
The Faint (US)
Faiz Ali Faiz (PAK)
Fantômas (US)
Faux Pas (DK)
 Marie Fisker (DK)
Fjärde Världen & Medina(S)
Flogging Molly (US)
Foo Fighters (US)
Four Tet (UK)
The Futureheads (UK)
 Game (US)
Gatas Parlament (N)
The Go! Team (UK)
Green Day (US)
Green Pitch (DK)
Juan Luis Guerra (DOM. REP.)
The Haunted (S)
Armand Van Helden (US)
Håkan Hellström (S)
Michele Henderson (DM)
Hess Is More (DK)
The Hidden Cameras (Can)
Iksceltascel (DK)
INTERPOL (US)
 ISIS (US)
The Iskariots (S)
J-Spliff (DK)
Jackman (N)
Jimmy Eat World (US)
Joe True (DK)
Johnossi (S)
Junior Senior (DK)
Kaada/Patton (N/US)
Kano (UK)
Mory Kanté (GUINEA)
Karen(DK)
 Kent (S)
Khonnor (US)
Konono No1 (CD)
Femi Kuti & The Positive Force (NG)
Kå (DK)
Lack (DK)
Laid Back (DK)
M83 (F)
Macaco (E)
MAHALA RAÏ BANDA (ROM)
Maldoror (JAP/US)
Mark One & Virus Syndicate (UK)
The Mars Volta (US)
Marvins Revolt (DK)
Mastodon (US)
Mercenary (DK)
Metric Noise (DK)
 Mew (DK)
Mimas (DK)
Mint Royale (UK)
 The Mitchell Brothers (UK)
Mugison (ISL)
Mylo (UK)
New Cool Collective Big Band (NL)
Joanna Newsom (US)
Aroma Jockey Odo7 (NL)
Ohoi! Soundsystem Feat. DJ 2000F, Kristobal Cologne,  DJ JSL, Tim Driver, MC B-LIVE, F.U.K.T & 2D VJS (DK/UK)
Oh No Ono (DK)
Opto Feat. Thomas Knak & Carsten Nicolai (DK/D)
Organiseret Riminalitet (DK)
 The Others (UK)
Outlandish (DK)
Patton/Rahzel (US)
The Perceptionists(US)
Plan B (UK)
Plantlife (US)
Plena Libre (PR)
The Ponys (US)
Queens Of Noize (UK)
Radio Mundial (US)
Rahzel & DJ JS-1 (US)
The Raveonettes (DK)
Craig Richards (UK)
Roots Manuva (UK)
Röyksopp (N)
Side Brok (N)
Mikael Simpson & SØLVSTORM (DK)
Ska Cubano (CUB/UK)
Skambankt (N)
Snoop Dogg (US)
Peter Sommer (DK)
Other Sides of Sonic Youth (US)
Sonic Youth (US)
The Spam Allstars (US)
Speech Defect (S)
Submission (DK)
Sunn O))) (US)
Svartbag (DK)
SYLVIE MARKS & HAL9000 (D)
The Tears (UK)
Thievery Corporation (US)
Le Tigre (US)
TIKEN JAH FAKOLY (CIV)
TIMBUKTU & DAMN! (S)
Tinariwen (ML)
TOCOTRONIC (D)
TOKYO SKA PARADISE ORCHESTRA (JAP)
Ali Farka Touré feat. Toumani Diabaté (ML)
Trentemøller feat. T.O.M. (DK)
Turbonegro (N)
Two Lone Swordsmen (UK)
Tys Tys (DK)
Tom Vek (UK)
Unexploded (DK)
Velvet Revolver (US)
WARREN SUICIDE (D)
Warsaw Village Band (PL)
BRIAN WILSON (US)

External links

Roskilde Festival by year
2005 in Danish music
2005 music festivals